The Extraordinary and Plenipotentiary Ambassador of Peru to the Republic of India is the official representative of the Republic of Peru to the Republic of India.

The ambassador in New Delhi is generally accredited to neighbouring countries, such as Afghanistan (suspended since 2021), Bangladesh, Iran, the Maldives, Nepal and Sri Lanka.

Both countries established diplomatic relations on 26 March 1963, which have continued since.

List of representatives

References

India
Peru